Malik-Shah II or  Mu'izz ad-Din Malik Shah II was Seljuq Sultan in Baghdad during 1105. He was the grandson of Malik Shah I, and was theoretically the head of the dynasty, although his relative Ahmad Sanjar in Khorasan probably held more effective power.
He was deposed and killed by his uncle Muhammed Tapar.

External links

Seljuk rulers
Year of birth unknown
Year of death unknown
11th-century Turkic people
Medieval rulers